Syndipnomyia is a genus of flies in the family Stratiomyidae.

Species
Syndipnomyia armata (Wulp, 1885)
Syndipnomyia auricincta Kertész, 1921
Syndipnomyia odyneroides Hollis, 1963

References

Stratiomyidae
Brachycera genera
Taxa named by Kálmán Kertész
Diptera of Australasia